State Route 228 (SR 228) is a state highway located in Aroostook County in northeastern Maine. It begins at State Route 164 in Washburn and runs north, then east, to State Route 161B in Caribou. SR 228 is signed as an east–west highway but occupies an alignment resembling an inverted letter V. It provides local access to Perham and Woodland which are bypassed by SR 164 between Washburn and Caribou. It is the only highway in Maine to have a designated truck route (see below).

Route description
SR 228 begins in downtown Washburn at SR 164. The highway leaves downtown as Hines Street, intersecting its truck route (Victoria Street, a bypass of downtown for large vehicles) before turning north. SR 228 turns northwest along Perham Road (signed east) and runs along the Bangor Aroostook Rail Trail. The highway nicks the northeastern corner of Wade, then crosses into the town of Perham. Upon reaching the village of Spaulding, SR 228 turns sharply east onto Woodland Center Road, then crosses into Woodland. The road continues east through Woodland Center and continues into the city of Caribou as Woodland Road, where SR 228 turns southeast and terminates at SR 161B (Sweden Street) west of downtown.

Major junctions

Truck route

State Route 228 Truck (internally designated SR 228T) is a  truck route of SR 228 that bypasses downtown Washburn. Its southern terminus is at SR 164 (Main Street) on the west side of downtown Washburn. Its northern terminus is at SR 228 (Hines Street) just north of downtown.

The short route initially proceeds west from SR 164 as Canaan Street, crosses the Bangor Aroostook Rail Trail, then turns north onto Victoria Street. The road heads north, paralleling SR 164, and terminates at SR 228 just north of downtown.

SR 228T is the only state-numbered truck route designated by the Maine Department of Transportation. The road is not signed with standard "Truck" banners, but rather with "truck route" regulatory signs.

Junction list

References

External links

Floodgap Roadgap's RoadsAroundME: Maine State Route 228
Floodgap Roadgap's RoadsAroundME: Maine State Route 228T

228
Transportation in Aroostook County, Maine